Raymond Waibel Ketchledge (December 8, 1919 – October 23, 1987) was an American engineer, known for his contributions to the first computerized telephone switching control systems.

Biography
Born in Harrisburg, Pennsylvania, Ketchledge married Lois Jane Quackenbush. He earned a B.Sc. and M.Sc. (1942) in electrical engineering from the Massachusetts Institute of Technology before joining Bell Labs where he stayed for his whole professional career (1942–1982).

At Bell Labs he first worked on the Mark 24 FIDO Torpedo used in World War II, then took part in developing the first underwater repeater systems and the L3 coaxial carrier for Transatlantic telephone cable systems (1946–54), before becoming the leader of the Switching systems development group (1956).  This brought him fame due to the pioneering work on applying stored program architecture to telephone switching systems.  Ketchledge oversaw the installation project for the first 1ESS switch in Succasunna (1965).

Following this he directed the Indian Hill laboratories of Naperville, Illinois (1966–75), before returning to New Jersey where he oversaw the Ocean systems research division in Whippany, New Jersey, until his retirement. He held sixty patents in diverse areas, including thirty-one in switching systems.

He died of cancer at his home in Englewood, Florida, on October 23, 1987.

Awards
National Academy of Engineering inductee (1970)
IEEE Alexander Graham Bell Medal (1976) with Amos E. Joel Jr. and William Keister
IEEE Fellow
New Jersey Inventors Hall of Fame inductee

References

American electrical engineers
Scientists at Bell Labs
MIT School of Engineering alumni
People from Harrisburg, Pennsylvania
1919 births
1987 deaths
People from Hanover Township, New Jersey
People from Englewood, Florida
Engineers from Pennsylvania
Engineers from New Jersey
20th-century American engineers